The Mehjoor Nagar Sikh massacre refers to the fatal shooting of Sikhs on 3 February 2001 in the Srinagar district of Jammu and Kashmir, India. In this attack, at least six people were killed in a drive-by shooting and five were injured. The Mehjoor Nagar attack was the second big attack on the Sikh community of Kashmir in March 2000, unknown gunmen committed a mass massacre of 35 Sikhs in Chithi Singh Pora.

The killings
According to reports, this incident was triggered by the killing of an auto-rickshaw driver identified as Bilal Ahmed Khan of Gonikhan locality. Residents of Gonikhan alleged that two Sikh members of the special operations group (SOG) of the Jammu and Kashmir police boarded Bilal's auto-rickshaw the previous Wednesday. His body was later recovered from his auto near the bypass. The killing had triggered massive protest in Srinagar.

The names of the six dead in this case are Satnam Singh, Charanjeet Singh, Gurmeet Singh, Suraj Singh, Sumeet Pal Singh and Balwant Singh 
and the five injured are Kanwal Nain Singh, Satinder Kaur, Vikram Singh, Chand Kaur and Dharmender Singh 

All Parties Sikh Coordination Committee has alleged that the "Government failed to book the ‘killers’ involved in Chattisinghpora and Mehjoor Nagar massacres".

Aftermath
After the killings, several political and religious parties condemned the brutal killing. No arrests have been made in this case.

References 

Massacres of Sikhs
Massacres in 2001
2001 crimes in India
Jammu and Kashmir
Lashkar-e-Taiba attacks
21st-century mass murder in India
February 2001 events in India